Paul Power (born 1953) is an English football player.

Paul Power may also refer to:

 Paul Power, CEO of Refugee Council of Australia
 Paul Power (hurler) on Waterford U21 Hurling Team 1992
 Paul Power (actor) in Under California Stars